Nofret II (her name means Beautiful One) was an ancient Egyptian queen of the 12th dynasty. She was a daughter of Amenemhat II and wife of Senusret II.

Along with Khenemetneferhedjet I she was one of the two known wives of Senusret II; his other two possible wives were Khenemet and Itaweret.  All four were also Senusret's sisters. Two of her statues were found at Tanis and these are now in the Egyptian Museum in Cairo. The small pyramid in her husband's Kahun pyramid complex was probably built for her.

Her titles: King's Daughter; Great of Sceptre; Lady of the Two Lands.

Sources

Queens consort of the Twelfth Dynasty of Egypt
19th-century BC women